Max Klauß (born 27 July 1947 in Chemnitz) is a retired East German long jumper.

Biography
He competed for the sports clubs SC Karl-Marx-Stadt and SC Einheit Dresden during his active career.

Achievements

1947 births
Living people
East German male long jumpers
East German decathletes
Athletes (track and field) at the 1972 Summer Olympics
Olympic athletes of East Germany
Sportspeople from Chemnitz
Dresdner SC athletes
European Athletics Championships medalists